True Stories: Selected Non-Fiction is a collection of short non-fiction works by Australian writer Helen Garner first published in 1996 by Text Publishing. The short works in the collection start with Garner's immediate notes as a school teacher to her journalist accounts of visiting a morgue and a maternity ward in a hospital. It won the 1997 Nita Kibble Literary Award.

References

1996 non-fiction books
1996 short story collections
Australian short story collections